The Chernigovsky Skete in Sergiev Posad, Russia is a monastery standing unique in central Russia for hand-dug monk cells and prayer caves. Since 1990 it has been under restoration owing to state help and parishioner donations. After its blossom in the early 20th century as part of the Holy Trinity Sergius Lavra, the skete is regaining its status. Now about 10 monks live in the skit famous for its everyday unction sacrament with anointing. Pilgrims come here to bow to Elder Barnabas’ relics and 2 miracleous Chernigovskaya icon copies.

History 

The skete was founded in 1847 by holy fool Philippushka as a cave department of the Gethsemane Skete whose walls still stand opposite. In a picturesque forest Gethsemane hermits sought seclusion from passions. Philippushka's 14 partners dug cells and a cave temple in 1851 to become the Archangel Michael Cave Temple. They made a wooden blockhouse around the central prayer cave with its window top above the ground. The walls later became of stone, but it made underground life even tougher. The Chernigovskaya icon of Godmother donated the next year brought many miracles by healing the paralyzed, leprous and possessed. From then on it has symbolized and guarded the monastery. In the late 19th century the skete became a top Orthodox monastery during Rev. Barnabas of Gethsemane who hosted people all over Russia with consolation. He took on serving sufferers and foretelling their future. This monastic elder also foresaw the Bolshevik terror and even the Russian Orthodox Church revival. A Chernigovsky cathedral painting features Tsar Nicholas II with his family at a confession to Elder Barnabas. Some suggest the emperor took blessing for a martyr's death. In 1922 the skete was shut down and used as a prison, nursing home and boarding school serially. Only in 1990 was it returned to the Lavra.

Architecture 
The Chernigovsky skete is a small complex with the Chernigovsky Cathedral in the center, a holy spring in the caves underneath and a huge belfry above the gate. Its water once fed the underground monks, now it heals sufferers. The 5-tier belfry was built in the late 19th century, shortly after the 5-dome Chernigovsky Cathedral which replaced an old small wooden church without crushing the caves. These 2 main buildings built simultaneously but by different architects feature the pseudo-Russian red-brick style.

References 
 Russian version

External links 
 The Chernigovsky skete website

Russian Orthodox monasteries in Russia
Sketes
Cultural heritage monuments of federal significance in Moscow Oblast
Buildings and structures in Moscow Oblast